Birdz is an animated television series created by Larry Jacobs, who later worked on Cyberchase. It was produced by Nelvana Limited in association with CBS Television and STVE. The show was first aired on October 3, 1998, on CBS with the final episode's airing on January 2, 1999. Later, it was shown in Scotland in 2001, aired on Scottish Television and Grampian TV (now STV North) - now both known as STV. The show was returned from 2015 as part of the "Weans' World" block on STV Glasgow and STV Edinburgh.

Plot
The show is about an anthropomorphic 13-year-old bird named Eddie Storkowitz, who films his everyday life in aspiration of becoming a filmmaker. His family includes his father, Morty, who is a psychiatrist; mother Betty, an artist; college-age older sister Steffy; and baby sister Abby. Several episodes focus on Eddie's class, which includes an owl named Olivia, a robin named Spring, a turkey named Tommy, a woodpecker named Gregory, and a bat named Sleepy, plus teacher Miss Finch and principal Mr. Pip.

Theme music
The song "Surfin' Bird" by the Trashmen was covered as a theme song for the series.

Cancellation
The show's creator Larry Jacobs thought that the show received poor ratings because it aired after the news in most markets.

Cast and characters
 Susan Roman as Eddie
 David Huband as Morty
 Sally Cahill as Betty
 Stephanie Morgenstern as Steffy
 Alison Sealy-Smith as Abby
 Jill Frappier as Miss Finch
 Len Carlson as Mr. Pip
 Chris Wiggins as Officer Pigeon
 Richard Binsley as Mr. Nuthatch
 Ruby Smith-Merovitz as Spring
 Karen Bernstein as Olivia
 Adam Reid as Tommy
 Julie Lemieux as Sleepy
 Rick Jones as Gregory

Episodes

Telecast and home media
The show was first introduced in October 1998 on CBS's Saturday morning lineup with repeats until Spring 1999. In the 2000s, the show was also aired on the Omni Broadcasting Network. Later, it was shown in Scotland in 2001, aired on Scottish Television and Grampian TV (now STV North) - now both known as STV. The show was returned from 2015 as part of the "Weans' World" block on STV Glasgow and STV Edinburgh.

In the late 1990s, Alliance Atlantis released videotapes of the show.

In 2019, the show has begun being uploaded to Corus' Retro Rerun YouTube channel. As of 2022, the show is now streaming on Tubi.

References

External links

1998 Canadian television series debuts
1999 Canadian television series endings
1990s Canadian animated television series
Animated television series about birds
Canadian children's animated comedy television series
CBS original programming
CTV Television Network original programming
English-language television shows
Television series by Nelvana
Television series by STV Studios